South Bay Tower, also known as the Gateway Center, is a proposed skyscraper planned for Boston, Massachusetts. If completed, South Bay Tower would stand as the tallest building in Boston, Massachusetts, and New England, surpassing the 60-story John Hancock Tower by 7 stories and at least .

The site came under renewed interest in February 2016 when the State government considered selling it to developers with the potential for another massive proposal (1.5-2 million sq. ft.) that would involve the relocation of existing Department of Transportation facilities and the reconstruction of Veolia's energy plant.

See also
List of tallest buildings in Boston

References

External links
Entry on Skyscraperpage.com
Entry on Emporis

Skyscrapers in Boston
Proposed skyscrapers in the United States
Retail buildings in Massachusetts
Office buildings in Boston